Foochow Mission Cemetery (Chinese: 洋墓亭; Pinyin: Yángmùtíng; Foochow Romanized: Iòng-muó-dìng) was a Protestant cemetery once located on the north and south side of a hill at the west end of Maiyuan Road, Cangshan District, Fuzhou, China. Until 1949 there were more than 400 burials, with all tombs  in size and neatly aligned. The cemetery was demolished during the Cultural Revolution.

Notable interments
 Carl Joseph Fast
 Charles Hartwell
 Nathan Sites
 Robert Warren Stewart
 Isaac William Wiley

Gallery

References
 Fuzhou City Records

External links
 The Mission Cemetery of Fuh-Chau, by I.W. Wiley, 1858

Cemeteries in China
Protestant Reformed cemeteries
Buildings and structures in Fuzhou